Tiri is a village in the Zangilan District of Azerbaijan, lying close to the Araz River which forms the border between Azerbaijan and Iran.

History
The village was located in the Armenian-occupied territories surrounding Nagorno-Karabakh, coming under the control of ethnic Armenian forces during the First Nagorno-Karabakh War in 1993.

The village subsequently became part of the self-proclaimed Republic of Artsakh as part of its Kashatagh Province.

It was recaptured by Azerbaijan during the 2020 Nagorno-Karabakh war. Subsequently, Azerbaijani Ministry of Defence published a video from the village, showing the ruined state of the village following its occupation.

References 

Populated places in Zangilan District